Spirit of '76, released in May 1975, was the first of four albums that Spirit would (initially) release for Mercury Records, and their sixth album overall. Though all four albums were greatly influenced by the time that Randy California spent living in Hawaii, this album bears that influence more than any of the others (aside from maybe Future Games). Though it was largely ignored upon its first release, many fans consider it to be one of Spirit's best albums.

Most of this double album was compiled as part of the Mercury Years compilation in 1997. It was properly reissued on CD by Beat Goes On in 2003.

Track listing 
All songs written by Randy California and Ed Cassidy except noted.

Disc One

Disc Two

Personnel

Spirit 
Randy California - bass, guitar, vocals, multi-instruments
Ed Cassidy - percussion, drums
Barry Keane - bass
Benji - harpsichord, Moog synthesizer

Production 
Blair Mooney - engineer
Craig Renton - assistant engineer

Charts 
Album

References 

Spirit (band) albums
1975 albums
Mercury Records albums